"Patches" is a song written by Barry Mann and Larry Kolber and performed by Dickey Lee.  The song was produced by Bill Hall and Jack Clement. It was featured on his 1962 album The Tale of Patches. It reached No. 6 on the U.S. pop chart and No. 10 on the U.S. R&B chart in 1962.  The song ranked No. 74 on Billboard magazine's Top 100 singles of 1962.

Background 
Dickey Lee recorded "Patches" in a studio built by Jack Clement in Beaumont, Texas. Clement had come across the song written by Mann and Kolber while he was working for Chet Atkins at RCA, and he and Bill Hall produced the song for Lee. The song was initially released in the fall of 1961, however, the song was met with resistance from radio stations who refused to play the song as it dealt with teen suicide, and it failed to enter any chart for four months. Hall persisted to try to get a small radio station in Beaumont, Texas, to play the song. When it did, the song was received enthusiastically by the audience, and the song then spread to nearby radio stations in Houston, followed by other parts of the country. It eventually charted on Billboard Hot 100 in August 1962.

The song tells the story of teenage lovers of different social classes whose parents forbid their love.  The girl drowns herself in the "dirty old river."  The singer concludes: "It may not be right, but I'll join you tonight/ Patches I'm coming to you."  Because of the teen suicide theme, it was banned by a number of radio stations. Nevertheless, it managed to sell over one million copies and was awarded a gold disc.

Charts

Other versions
Browning Bryant released a version of the song on his 1969 album Patches.
 Rein De Vries recorded a Dutch version titled "Patsy" which reached No. 15 on the Dutch Top 40.

References

1961 songs
1962 singles
Songs written by Barry Mann
Dickey Lee songs
Song recordings produced by Jack Clement
Smash Records singles
Songs about suicide
Teenage tragedy songs
Songs about rivers